Sherman Foote Denton (24 September 1856 – 24 June 1937) was an American naturalist, illustrator, specimen collector, inventor, writer, and entrepreneur. Along with his brothers Shelley Wright and Robert Winsford he started Denton Brothers Butterflies Company which sold mounted butterfly specimens. Individual butterflies were mounted on plaster under a glass frame, a technique that he patented and known as "Denton mounts".

Life and work 

Denton was born in Dayton, Ohio, the first son of Elizabeth M. née Foote (1826–1916) and William Denton (1823–1883) a geologist who became a promoter of psychic seeing abilities that he claimed his wife possessed in strong measure but one that existed in everyone. The family interest in natural history was inculcated in the children early. Sherman and his brother Shelley travelled with their father who gave lectures around the world. William claimed that Sherman could draw the evolutionary history of birds through psychic abilities. Sherman participated in experiments by his father who claimed that rocks and other inanimate objects held a photographic record that sensitive people could see. Sherman drew several birds that he claimed to be able to see based on an examination of fossil tracks from Connecticut. The senior Denton died from fever in 1883 while on a tour in Papua New Guinea. The two sons collected natural history specimens extensively on the three year tour. Sherman Denton returned home and then joined the US Fish Commission working as an artist who also worked on the collection and mounting of specimens. He developed a patented technique for life-like mounting and prior to preparing them, he would produce careful water-colour paintings. His careful illustrations were praised for their accuracy. His illustrations included those of the now extinct Salvelinus agassizi under the name of "Canadian Red Trout". A subspecies of cuckoo-shrike Lalage leucomela insulicola was described by W.E. Clyde Todd on the basis of specimens collected by the Denton brothers in the Carnegie Museum. Sherman invented and patented, in 1901, the mounting of lepidopteran specimens on a white plaster tablet under glass instead of the traditional pinning. Along with his brother he sold numerous mounted specimens made by the Denton Brothers Company in Wellesley. He also produced numerous butterfly scale prints (also called lepidochromes). The two volume book As Nature Shows Them (1900) produced in a limited 500 copies made use of actual butterfly and moth wing transfers for the coloured plates, with the body and legs hand painted. Denton also took an interest in pearls, made a large collection of freshwater pearls, and published a book on pearls in 1916. His brother Shelley worked as a curator of the bird collections at Cambridge, Massachusetts, around 1887 and catalogued the collections of William Brewster (1851–1919).

Denton died at his Wellesley Farm and was buried in Woodlawn cemetery. The street in Wellesley where the family lived was later renamed as Denton Road. Denton mounts of nearly 1400 specimens were gifted by their heirs to the Wellesley Historical Society. Vladimir Nabokov wrote about his own interest in butterflies and noted that his aunts would gift him "ridiculous presents such as Denton mounts of resplendent but really quite ordinary insects." In 1941, Nabokov made a visit to the collections held at 11, Denton Road and commented that they were "marvellous specimens, but with ... catastrophic labels and without localities."

References

External links 

 Incidents of a collector's rambles in Australia, New Zealand, and New Guinea (1889)
 As nature shows them : moths and butterflies of the United States (Volume 1) (Volume 2) (1900) Lepidoptera plates (NYPL)
 Biography of William Denton
 The story of the pearl (1916)
 Borne on the Wings of History by Beth Hinchliffe in the Wellesley Weston Magazine

1856 births
1937 deaths
American naturalists
Businesspeople from Dayton, Ohio
People from Wellesley, Massachusetts
Wildlife artists